Plastic Pig may refer to:

British Rail Class 442
Reliant Robin#In popular culture